"Waterfalls" is a song by American hip-hop group TLC. It was written by Marqueze Etheridge and Organized Noize with a verse by TLC's Lisa "Left Eye" Lopes, for their second album, CrazySexyCool (1994), with production by Organized Noize. The song was the third single released from the album on May 22, 1995, in the United States, followed by a United Kingdom release on August 5, 1995.

Often considered the group's signature song, "Waterfalls" was an international hit, topping the charts in many countries. The song spent seven weeks at  1 on the Billboard Hot 100, giving the group their second US No. 1. The song was the No. 2 song of the year on the Billboard 1995 year-end chart. "Waterfalls" also peaked at No. 1 in New Zealand and Switzerland while reaching the top ten in many other countries. "Waterfalls" received critical acclaim, earning two Grammy nominations at the 38th Annual Grammy Awards in 1996 for Record of the Year and Best Pop Performance by a Duo or Group with Vocal.

The song addresses the illegal drug trade, promiscuity, and HIV/AIDS. Jarett E. Nolan of BMG noted that "Waterfalls" was the first number-one song to refer to AIDS in one of its verses. The music video for the song reflected its socially conscious lyrics. With a million-dollar budget, the video was an MTV staple that boosted the song's success. It stayed atop the MTV Video Monitor chart for over a month, making TLC the first act to do so. The video won four MTV Video Music Awards in 1995, including Video of the Year. TLC was the first African-American act to receive the trophy.

Background
"Waterfalls" is an R&B song, written by TLC band member Lisa "Left Eye" Lopes with Marqueze Etheridge and Organized Noize, who also produced the song. Rozonda "Chilli" Thomas and Tionne "T-Boz" Watkins perform the song with Lopes, who also provides a rap verse. The background vocals are performed by the members of TLC, as well as Debra Killings and Cee-Lo Green, while the improvised bass line is provided by LaMarquis "ReMarqable" Jefferson. Of Green's involvement, Watkins noted, "He was in Goodie Mob, we grew up together, we go way back. He (sang on the track) and it was amazing! I love his voice."

The song's lyrics refer to 1990s issues such as the HIV/AIDS epidemic and violence associated with the illegal drug trade. Watkins said that it was important for the group to "get the message across without seeming like preaching."

The TLC song shares elements with Paul McCartney's song of the same name, which opens with the line "Don't go jumping waterfalls, please keep to the lake." McCartney himself noted the resemblance, stating "In fact, somebody had a hit, a few years ago, using the first line...then they go off into another song. It's like, 'Excuse me?'"

Critical reception
"Waterfalls" received critical acclaim from music critics. J.D. Considine from The Baltimore Sun described it as "tuneful and intoxicating". Entertainment Weekly viewed it as a "Prince-inspired ballad" that "hint[s] at the artistic greatness TLC might achieve if freed from commercial concerns." A reviewer from Music Week gave it four out of five, calling it "yet another radio-friendly hit", remarking that "TLC swap wackiness for a more mature affair". James Hamilton from the RM Dance Update deemed it a "slinkily croaking and coing girls' US smash rolling slow sombrely worded message song". Charles Aaron from Spin described it as "a Princely cautionary groove, in which pop's most intriguing trio offers a more harshly vivid portrait—that of a loved one (who should have known better) gone wanna-be dopeman. When T-Boz croons, "She gives him loving that his body can't handle / But all he can say is baby it's good to me", her resigned frustration is palpable. And every time Left Eye raps, "Dreams are hopeless aspirations in hopes of comin' true", I whince a little." Nigel Butler of Sputnikmusic compared it to esteemed artists such as Sly and the Family Stone, Ray Charles and Stevie Wonder. Butler wrote, "The arrangement and instrumentation is absolutely fantastic - if a bunch of great melodies had an orgy, the result would something a little like this - and the lyrics are the best on an album that maintains a shockingly high standard of songwriting. Left-Eye drops the album's best rap on this track too."

The song was nominated for two Grammys at the 1996 Grammy Awards: Record of the Year and Best Pop Performance by a Duo or Group with Vocal. Billboard named it No. 11 on their list of "100 Greatest Girl Group Songs of All Time". It was also ranked 13th in VH1's "100 Greatest Songs of the Past 25 Years" and 8th on VH1's "100 Greatest Songs of the 1990s". In 2010, Billboard awarded the song the top position of summer songs in 1995.

Music video
The accompanying music video for "Waterfalls" visualizes the two verses of the song, particularly during extended instrumental breaks after each verse:
An inner-city teen ignores his mother's pleas to quit selling drugs; her spirit stands in front of him silently begging him to stop, but he is shot dead as he is about to make a sale on a street corner. At the end of the video, the dead teen's own spirit is futilely trying to embrace his mother as she walks down the street, but as she can no longer see him, she walks through his ghostly form each time. 
A woman eschews protection as she and her boyfriend have sex. Over time, looking in a mirror, he notices that his face shows early symptoms of AIDS. A small twin photo frame nearby shows her picture in the left while a rapid montage of all her previous lovers flashes in the right. At the end, the two wordlessly sit at the edge of her bed as the man and his picture both fade away; the woman briefly sits alone until she and her picture also fade away, after which the unused condom appears in front of the now-empty frames.

The video also intercuts scenes of liquefied versions of TLC performing to the song while standing on top of an ocean and performing in front of a real waterfall.

The video was directed by F. Gary Gray and features Ella Joyce, Bokeem Woodbine, Shyheim, Paul J. Alessi and Gabrielle Bramford. TLC had to force L.A. Reid to get the budget for the music video, which was filmed at Universal Studios Hollywood from June 8–9, 1995.  The video went on to win four awards at the 1995 MTV Video Music Awards: Video of the Year, Best Group Video, Best R&B Video, and the Viewer's Choice Award. Watkins stated in retrospect that the "video spoke for a whole epidemic."

Live performances
The song was performed at many awards shows, including the 1995 MTV Video Music Awards and the 1996 Grammy Awards. The group performed "Waterfalls" at the 1995 MTV Movie Awards wearing black tops and silver pants. The performance "was theatrical and kept true to the lyrical story." They also performed the song at MTV's 20th Anniversary on August 1, 2001, making it Left Eye's final performance with the group before her death. In September 1995, TLC performed "Waterfalls" in a medley with "Creep" and "Diggin' on You" on the British TV chart show Top of the Pops, aired on BBC One in the United Kingdom.

Remaining members T-Boz and Chilli performed the song along with Alicia Keys and fellow girl groups En Vogue and SWV at the 2008 BET Awards. Thomas and Watkins appeared on Good Morning America on October 15, 2013 to perform the song during promotion for the greatest hits 20 and the VH1 biopic CrazySexyCool: The TLC Story.

On November 24, 2013, TLC performed at the 2013 American Music Awards with special guest Lil Mama, who performed Left Eye's rap in tribute to her.

Legacy
About.com included "Waterfalls" in their ranking of "The Best 100 Songs From the 1990s" in 2019. Bill Lamb stated that "slinky, gently insistent backing horns and guitar combine with smooth, languid vocals to create an instant R&B classic." He also felt that the song is "a disturbing commentary on street violence and its impact on the lives of young black men." Daryl McIntosh from Albumism said it is "a rare example of perfect production, poignant songwriting, and flawless vocal delivery." McIntosh added, "The lyrics offer cautionary tales of the allure of street life and uncontrolled sexual exploration. Interwoven by the melodic chorus". AllMusic's Stephen Thomas Erlewine wrote that "Waterfalls, "with its gently insistent horns and guitar lines and instantly memorable chorus, ... ranks as one of the classic R&B songs of the '90s." Christine Werthman from Complex wrote that it "is drenched in water-droplet synth notes, live drums, rising horns, and a bass line that walks wherever it pleases." She noted that "it's a heavy song, but the warnings in the verses are buoyed by a rich, singable chorus, which certainly helped it get radio play." Jeff Benjamin of Fuse felt that the track was "far more than just another pop hit: The track told a cautionary tale of HIV and AIDS, and its video depicted a man who didn't wear a condom with his girlfriend and later watched his body degenerate in the mirror." Sputnikmusic's Butler asserted that "any list of the best singles of the 90s that does not include this in the top 15 — at least — is among the worst lists ever written." Australian music channel Max placed the song at No. 196 on their list of "1000 Greatest Songs of All Time" in 2012. In 2017, Paste ranked the song number two on their list of the 10 greatest TLC songs, and in 2022, The Guardian ranked the song number one on their list of the 20 greatest TLC songs.

The song was referred to in the film The Other Guys as one of many references to songs by TLC made by one of the characters. Thomas and Watkins rerecorded "Waterfalls" with Japanese pop and R&B singer Namie Amuro in 2013 for the song's twentieth anniversary. The song peaked at No. 12 on Japan's Hot 100 chart. That same year, the song was referred to in the film We're the Millers as Will Poulter performs Lopes's rap. The song also appears in the film's end credits. In 2015, the horror-comedy show Scream Queens featured the song in the pilot and is referred to numerous times in other episodes. It appears in the 2019 Marvel Studios film Captain Marvel, which is set in 1995. It was also heard once in the scene where the girls discuss sex in the Little Fires Everywhere miniseries adaptation episode, "The Spider Web".

Accolades

(*) indicates the list is unordered.

Awards

Track listings

 US 7-inch and cassette single
A. "Waterfalls" (single edit) – 4:19
B. "Waterfalls" (album instrumental) – 4:42

 US 12-inch single
A1. "Waterfalls" (single edit) – 4:19
A2. "Waterfalls" (DARP remix) – 4:27
A3. "Waterfalls" (album instrumental) – 4:42
B1. "Waterfalls" (ONP remix) – 4:34
B2. "Waterfalls" (ONP remix instrumental) – 5:19
B3. "Waterfalls" (acappella) – 4:05

 US, Australian, and Japanese CD single
 "Waterfalls" (single edit) – 4:19
 "Waterfalls" (ONP remix) – 4:34
 "Waterfalls" (DARP remix) – 4:27
 "Waterfalls" (album instrumental) – 4:42

 UK CD single
 "Waterfalls" (no rap radio edit) – 3:32
 "Waterfalls" (single version) – 4:19
 "Waterfalls" (ONP remix) – 4:34
 "Waterfalls" (DARP remix) – 4:27
 "Waterfalls" (album instrumental) – 4:42

 UK 12-inch single
A1. "Waterfalls" (ONP remix) – 4:34
A2. "Waterfalls" (single version) – 4:19
B1. "Waterfalls" (DARP remix) – 4:27
B2. "Waterfalls" (album instrumental) – 4:42

 UK cassette single
 "Waterfalls" (no rap radio edit) – 3:32
 "Waterfalls" (DARP remix) – 4:27

 European CD single
 "Waterfalls" (no rap radio edit) – 3:32
 "Waterfalls" (ONP remix) – 4:34

 Australian cassette single
A1. "Waterfalls" (single edit)
A2. "Waterfalls" (DARP remix)
A3. "Waterfalls" (album instrumental)
B1. "Waterfalls" (ONP remix)
B2. "Waterfalls" (ONP remix instrumental)
B3. "Waterfalls" (album version)

Charts

Weekly charts

Year-end charts

Decade-end charts

All-time charts

Certifications

Stooshe version

"Waterfalls" was recorded by British girl group Stooshe originally recorded for their self-titled debut album, released through Warner Music UK on November 11, 2012. Stooshe chose to release a cover of "Waterfalls" after meeting TLC member T-Boz, who had previously congratulated them on their acoustic cover of the song. The band have turned the track's rap, performed by Lisa "Left Eye" Lopes, into a three-part harmony. It was announced in April 2013 that the group's cover of "Waterfalls" would not be appearing on their debut album, with member Karis Anderson claiming they "are pretending [it] didn't happen".

Critical reception
4Music's Trent Maynard stated that Stooshe's take on "Waterfalls" has "smooth, layered harmonies and a easy-breezy barbershop feel." Digital Spy's Lewis Corner gave the song three out of five stars and commented "It must be said that soft flourishes of brass and light guitar strums blend with the girls' on-point vocals smoother than a Starbucks cappuccino. However, after proving themselves as one of 2012's most promising original pop acts, covering a much-loved '90s anthem still feels like a strange move." Jon Hornbuckle from So So Gay gave the song four stars and stated "Covering a song as famous as TLC's global hit 'Waterfalls' could backfire on a girl group, but Stooshe shouldn't be worried. Their take on the classic 1995 hit is yet another opportunity for them to showcase their fantastic voices and is a sure-fire hit, with its radio friendly vibes and sing-along chorus." He thought the song sounded "fresh" and Stooshe had managed to put their own stamp on the track. Hornbuckle added "If only all cover tracks were like this – a re-interpretation, rather than a copy-and-paste cover."

Music video
Stooshe released an official lyric video for the track on October 3, before unveiling the official music video on T4 on October 7. The video, directed by Matt Stawski, features cameo appearances from fellow TLC members T-Boz and Chilli. Hornbuckle commented "The video is perhaps the most colourful promo from a girl group for years, and we love the choreography the girls pull out on the chorus. Stooshe make being cool, classy and fun all at once look effortless."

Track listing
Waterfalls (Remixes) - EP
"Waterfalls" – 3:27
"Waterfalls" (Moto Blanco Remix) – 7:07
"Waterfalls" (DJ Q Remix) – 5:46
"Waterfalls" (Show 'n' Prove Remix) – 3:16
"Waterfalls" (Acoustic) – 3:41

CD single
"Waterfalls" - 3:28
"See Me Like This" - 3:29

Charts

Release history

Bette Midler version

"Waterfalls" was recorded by singer and actress Bette Midler for her 2014 album It's The Girls!. The track was made into a ballad and has a much slower tempo and its production is stripped down with a piano and a soft drum beat echoing in the background. Midler's cover does not include the rap part of the song.

References

Bibliography
 The Billboard Book of Number 1 Hits (fifth edition)

External links
 

1994 songs
1995 singles
2012 singles
Billboard Hot 100 number-one singles
MTV Video of the Year Award
Music videos directed by F. Gary Gray
Number-one singles in New Zealand
Number-one singles in Switzerland
Number-one singles in Zimbabwe
Contemporary R&B ballads
Songs written by Lisa Lopes
TLC (group) songs
Songs about HIV/AIDS
Songs about drugs
LaFace Records singles
Arista Records singles
Warner Music Group singles
1990s ballads